James Avery (September 23, 1937 – March 8, 2009) was an American classical pianist and conductor.

Avery was born in Hutchinson, Kansas and studied at the University of Kansas, and then at Indiana University (Bloomington) under Tibor Kozma. From 1967 to 1980 he taught at the University of Iowa in Iowa City, and from 1980 until 2002 at the Hochschule für Musik Freiburg in Germany. From 1992 he headed Ensemble SurPlus, playing mostly new music. Avery recorded works by Stefan Wolpe, Charles Wuorinen, Brian Ferneyhough, and Karlheinz Stockhausen. In the fall of 1978 he took a leave of absence from the University of Iowa in order to be a visiting artist at the American Academy in Rome .

In 1992 he formed the contemporary music ensemble SurPlus, which he conducted and in which he performed on the piano. After its debut in Freiburg, Ensemble SurPlus performed at the Darmstädter Ferienkurse and at festivals throughout Europe .

Sources
 
 
 The Andy Warhol Museum https://www.warhol.org/event/sound-series-ensemble-surplus/

External links 
 Claus-Steffen Mahnkopf. Spiritus rector fürs Unmögliche // Neue Musikzeitung, # 4, 2009.
 Johannes Adam. Ein Amerikaner in Freiburg // Badische Zeitung, 11. März 2009.
 Ensemble SurPlus https://en.ensemble-surplus.com/#about

1937 births
2009 deaths
20th-century American male musicians
20th-century American pianists
20th-century classical pianists
American classical pianists
American male classical pianists
Academic staff of the Hochschule für Musik Freiburg
People from Hutchinson, Kansas